Boroec  is a village in the municipality of Struga, North Macedonia.

Demographics

Boroec has traditionally been inhabited by Orthodox Christian Macedonians and a Macedonian Muslim (Torbeš) population.

According to the 2002 census, the village had a total of 629 inhabitants. Ethnic groups in the village include:

Macedonians 193
Turks 175
Albanians 74
Others 187

References

External links

Villages in Struga Municipality
Macedonian Muslim villages